Louise Shanahan (born 26 January 1997) is an Irish athlete. She competed in the women's 800 metres event at the 2020 Summer Olympics. Shanahan obtained a BSc degree in physics from the University College Cork (Cork, Ireland) in 2019.

Biography
When she was growing up, Shanahan's father, Ray, was her coach, until she moved to England. In 2013, Shanahan became the European Youth Champion in the 800 metres. However, after breaking a bone in her foot in 2015, she struggled to maintain her form. Despite this, she was the Irish 1500m champion in 2021. Her father was also an Irish national champion in the 1500 meters, making them the first father and daughter to become national champions in Ireland in that event.

From February 2021, she began to improve her performances in an attempt to take part in the delayed 2020 Summer Olympics in Tokyo, after the World Student Games were cancelled. She made the qualification for the Ireland Olympic team following results in Europe ahead of the Games. At the beginning of 2021, she had targeted a place at the 2024 Summer Olympics in Paris.

Outside of sport, Shanahan graduated from the University of Cork, and is completing a PhD in physics at Trinity College, Cambridge.

References

External links
 

1997 births
Living people
Irish female middle-distance runners
Athletes (track and field) at the 2020 Summer Olympics
Olympic athletes of Ireland
Place of birth missing (living people)
Athletes (track and field) at the 2014 Summer Youth Olympics
Sportspeople from Cork (city)